Archidela is a genus of beetles in the family Cicindelidae that was formed from the breakup of Cicindela. It contains the following species:

 Archidela darwini (Sloane, 1909)
 Archidela nigrina (W.J. MacLeay, 1888)

References

Cicindelidae